This is a list of Savannah State Tigers football players in the NFL Draft.

Key

Selections

References

Lists of National Football League draftees by college football team

Savannah State Tigers NFL Draft